Sesheke is a border town in the Western Province of Zambia, in a district of the same name.  It lies on the northern bank of the Zambezi River which forms the border with Namibia's Caprivi Strip at that point.  

The Katima Mulilo Bridge, completed in May 2004, spans the river here, connecting Sesheke with the Namibian town of Katima Mulilo.  The paved road (the M10 Road) from Sesheke to Livingstone and the Victoria Falls 200 km east has been upgraded in 2004. The new bridge and road were financed by German donor bank Kreditanstalt für Wiederaufbau and were the last missing link in the so-called "Trans Caprivi Corridor" (today known as the Walvis Bay-Ndola-Lubumbashi Development Road). This 2500 km long asphalt road now connects Zambia's Copperbelt with Namibia's sea port Walvis Bay. As a direct result, the amount of road freight traffic has greatly increased. An investment and construction boom is rapidly transforming both Sesheke and Katima Mulilo, as well as surrounding areas.

Improved road access and the construction of new lodges and other tourist facilities have also increased the number of tourists passing through Sesheke on their way to the Victoria Falls, to the Sioma Ngwezi National Park 50 km west of the town, or to the upper Zambezi and the Barotse Floodplain.

The recent boom has also increased rural-urban migration, the growth of squatter camps near Sesheke and Katima Mulilo, cross-border smuggling and related social problems on both sides of the Zambian-Namibian border. Both Sesheke District and the Caprivi Region are at the bottom end of socio-economic development in their respective countries.  

A main highway (the M10 Road), unpaved and therefore in poor condition (extremely poor during the rainy season, November to April), runs alongside the Zambezi connecting Sesheke to Senanga and Mongu upriver.  The road runs on the south bank of the river upstream from Sesheke. Zambian traffic must cross the Katima Mulilo Bridge but does not have to enter Namibia, as the bridge is entirely located on Zambian territory.

Schools In Sesheke
Sesheke Secondary School 
Sesheke Primary School 
Mangamu Primary School
Nakatindi Primary School 
Katongo Primary School 
Simugoma Primary School 
Katima Secondary School 
Silolo Primary School 
Lusu Primary School 
Kalobolelwa Secondary School 
Njoko Primary School 
Loanja Primary School
Mabumbu Primary School 
Mwandi Basic School 

Namibia–Zambia border crossings
Populated places in Western Province, Zambia